Roha Ashtami is a twin city  and a municipal council in Raigad district in the Indian state of Maharashtra.

Demographics
At the 2001 India census, Roha Ashtami had a population of 19,082. Males constitute 52% of the population and females 48%. Roha Ashtami has an average literacy rate of 81%, higher than the national average of 59.5%: male literacy is 83%, and female literacy is 78%. In Roha Ashtami, 12% of the population is under 6 years of age.

References

Cities and towns in Raigad district